Bué is a commune in the Cher department, located in the Centre-Val de Loire region, France.

Geography
It is one of only a few communes allowed to produce Sancerre wines.

Population

Sights
 The church of St. Radegonde, dating from the nineteenth century.
 A feudal motte.
 The ruins of an ancient abbey.

See also
Communes of the Cher department

References

External links

Website about Bué 
Official website of the commune 

Communes of Cher (department)